In music notation, a tie is a curved line connecting the heads of two notes of the same pitch, indicating that they are to be played as a single note with a duration equal to the sum of the individual notes' values. A tie is similar in appearance to a slur; however, slurs join notes of different pitches which need to be played independently, but seamlessly (legato).

Ties are used for three reasons: (a) when holding a note across a bar line; (b) when holding a note across a beat within a bar, i.e. to allow the beat to be clearly seen; and (c) for unusual note lengths which cannot be expressed in standard notation.

Explanation

A writer in 1901, said that the following definition is preferable to the previous:

Other sources:

Ties are normally placed opposite the stem direction of the notes, unless there are two or more voices simultaneously.

The tie shown at the top right connects a quarter note (crotchet) to a sixteenth note (semiquaver), creating a note  as long as a quarter note, or five times as long as a sixteenth note—there is no single note value to express this duration. However, in some cases one might tie two notes that could be written with a single note value, such as a quarter note tied to an eighth note (the same length as a dotted quarter). This might be because:

A barline is between the notes

The second note begins a metric grouping, falling on a stressed beat of the meter. This change in notation (choosing the tie rather than the longer note value) does not affect performance, but it makes the music easier to read. Sometimes it can be used to make it clear that it has the appropriate rhythm. For example, a  measure with three equal notes would have a quarter note on each side but two tied eighth notes in the middle; a  measure with three equal notes would have all quarter notes.

Several notes in succession can be tied together. Such a succession can also be part of a larger, slurred phrase, in which case, ties and slurs must be used simultaneously and distinguishably.

History
The tie first appeared in 1523 in the Recerchari, motetti, canzoni by Marco Antonio Cavazzoni. The tie was used to show the duration of differing harmonies on early figured basses to show how they should be sounded over the held bass note. Many early pianists, like Beethoven, used the tie in many pieces to show the demand of gentle reiteration.

Notes

References

External links
 Ties Explained – A simple explanation of tied notes

Articulations (music)